Ratko Nikolić (born 15 September 1977) is a Serbian politician and former handball player serving as a member of the National Assembly since 8 December 2021. He is a member of the Socialist Party of Serbia (SPS).

Club career
After starting out at his hometown club Šamot, Nikolić spent three seasons with Crvena zvezda (1996–1999) and four seasons with Sintelon (1999–2003). He later moved abroad and played for Fotex Veszprém (2003–2004), Altea (2004–2005), Portland San Antonio (2005–2010), Al Sadd (2010), KIF Kolding (2010–2011), Vardar (2011–2012), Dinamo Minsk (2012–2013) and Borac Banja Luka (2013–2016).

International career
Nikolić made his major international debut for FR Yugoslavia at the 1999 World Championship, winning the bronze medal. He also took part in the 2000 Summer Olympics and two European Championships (2004 and 2006). Previously, Nikolić won the gold medal at the 1998 World University Championship.

Starting from late 2006, Nikolić represented Serbia and captained the team at the 2009 World Championship.

Honours
Crvena zvezda
 Handball Championship of FR Yugoslavia: 1996–97, 1997–98
Sintelon
 Handball Cup of FR Yugoslavia: 1999–2000
Fotex Veszprém
 Nemzeti Bajnokság I: 2003–04
 Magyar Kupa: 2003–04
Vardar
 Macedonian Handball Cup: 2011–12
 SEHA League: 2011–12
Dinamo Minsk
 Belarusian Men's Handball Championship: 2012–13
 Belarusian Men's Handball Cup: 2012–13
Borac Banja Luka
 Handball Championship of Bosnia and Herzegovina: 2013–14, 2014–15
 Handball Cup of Bosnia and Herzegovina: 2013–14, 2014–15

Political career 
Nikolić is a member of the Socialist Party of Serbia (SPS). He received 39th position on SPS's electoral list for the 2020 parliamentary election. The list won 32 seats with Nikolić failing to get elected to the National Assembly. Following the death of MP Milutin Mrkonjić, Nikolić replaced him and was sworn in as MP on 8 December 2021. He received 24th position on SPS's electoral list for the 2022 parliamentary election. The list won 31 seats and Mitrović was elected to the National Assembly.

References

External links
 
 
 
 MKSZ record

1977 births
Living people
People from Aranđelovac
Serbian male handball players
Olympic handball players of Yugoslavia
Handball players at the 2000 Summer Olympics
RK Crvena zvezda players
RK Sintelon players
Veszprém KC players
SDC San Antonio players
KIF Kolding players
RK Vardar players
RK Borac Banja Luka players
Liga ASOBAL players
Expatriate handball players
Serbian expatriate sportspeople in Hungary
Serbian expatriate sportspeople in Spain
Serbian expatriate sportspeople in Denmark
Serbian expatriate sportspeople in North Macedonia
Serbian expatriate sportspeople in Belarus
Serbian expatriate sportspeople in Bosnia and Herzegovina
Socialist Party of Serbia politicians
Members of the National Assembly (Serbia)